Ryu Tong-song (born 27 January 1979) is a North Korean former footballer. He represented North Korea on at least one occasion in 2005.

Career statistics

International

References

1979 births
Living people
North Korean footballers
North Korea international footballers
Association football goalkeepers
April 25 Sports Club players